Le Sueur or LeSueur may refer to:

Places in the United States 
 Le Sueur, Minnesota, a city
 Le Sueur County, Minnesota
 Le Sueur River, a river in Minnesota
 LeSueur, Virginia

Other uses 
 Le Sueur (surname)
 Le Sueur, a brand of canned vegetables, associated with Green Giant